Minuscule 573 (in the Gregory-Aland numbering), ε 447 (in the Soden numbering), is a Greek minuscule manuscript of the New Testament, on parchment. Palaeographically it has been assigned to the year 13th century.
The manuscript has complex contents.

Description 

The codex contains the text of the four Gospels on 189 parchment leaves (size ). The writing is in one column per page, 29 lines per page.

Text 

The Greek text of the codex is a representative of the Byzantine text-type. Hermann von Soden classified it to Ak, related to the Antiocheian commentated text (along with 534, 546, 558, 715). Aland placed it in Category V.

According to the Claremont Profile Method it represents Kx in Luke 1 and Luke 20. In Luke 10 no profile was made.

History 

The manuscript was written in time of Andronikos II Palaiologos (1272–1332).

It was bought from Athens in 1884 along with the codex 531. It was examined and described by William Charles Braithwaite.

The manuscript is currently housed in the Cadbury Research Library, University of Birmingham (Braithwaite Greek MS 2).

See also 

 List of New Testament minuscules
 Biblical manuscript
 Textual criticism

References

Further reading 

 

Greek New Testament minuscules
13th-century biblical manuscripts